The Battle of Arapey was an encounter between the Luso-Brazilian forces under José de Abreu Mena Barreto and  the Artiguist forces led by José Artigas, the independentist caudillo himself, in Salto, modern-day Uruguay. 

The encounter ended with a decisive victory for the Luso-Brazilian forces.

References

Arapey
Arapey
Arapey
1816 in Portugal
1816 in Brazil
1816 in Uruguay